Jason Lee Pusey (born 18 February 1989) is a Gibraltarian footballer who plays for South Cave United and the Gibraltar national football team. Beginning his career in the famed youth set up at Atlético Madrid, Pusey has gone on to play in Spain and Gibraltar, as well as earning 4 caps for his national side. He completed his free transfer to the 2022 Whitehead Fish and Chips cup winners South Cave United for the 2022/23 season.

Club career

Early career
Pusey began his career at Atlético Madrid, spending 2 years at the top level of the club's youth team as well as turning out for the C team. Following his release from the club in 2007, he spent a year playing for Cádiz B followed by two seasons at Atlético Zabal. Pusey left Zabal in 2010 to take a break from football and study in the UK, returning to his native Gibraltar in 2012 to sign for Lions Gibraltar. Pusey was a regular in the first team at Lions but could not prevent the club finishing 5th of 6 teams, finishing above Glacis United on goal difference.

Return to Gibraltar

After Gibraltar was admitted to UEFA in 2013, the Gibraltar Premier Division expanded to 8 teams, and in this new format Pusey left Lions to play for Glacis United. Again, Pusey played a central role in defence as Glacis finished 5th in the table, but the summer saw him move clubs once again, this time to the previous season's runners up Manchester 62. Here he saw first team chances diminish, with only 7 appearances over two disappointing seasons at the club before a move to Gibraltar United in summer 2016. Here, he saw his career get back on track, with 23 games over the course of the season helping Gibraltar United avoid relegation, and attracting the attention of national team coach Jeff Wood. His performances then attracted the attention of Lincoln Red Imps, and he joined the Gibraltar football giants in the summer of 2017.

While he was named on the bench for Lincoln's opening qualifiers for the Europa League, he didn't see any action until he appeared in the Pepe Reyes Cup against Europa, picking up his first silverware as Lincoln won 5–3 on penalties. The consistency of Roy Chipolina and Ryan Casciaro at the heart of the Lincoln defence saw opportunities limited, however, with a 20 minute cameo against former club Glacis United on 27 September being his only action for the first team. In an effort to gain more first team football and remain in contention for the national team, Pusey went out on loan in January 2018 to Gibraltar Phoenix. Although he missed Phoenix's first game after the winter break against his parent club, he made his debut on 16 February 2018, again against Glacis United. He played the full 90 minutes in a 1–0 victory. At the end of the season, he was released by his parent club.  He joined Gibraltar Phoenix permanently in the summer, making his debut as club captain on 15 August 2018 against Lynx. After a season plagued by injury, he joined Europa on 13 June 2019. However, he left the club mid-way through the season without playing a single first team game, joining Europa Point as a free agent at the end of January 2020. He made his debut on 30 January against Glacis United. Although originally set to continue as vice-captain for the next season, Pusey terminated his contract in June, citing personal reasons.

International career
Pusey's first taste of international football for Gibraltar came in 2015 at the 2015 Island Games. He was first called up to the Gibraltar national football team in 2016, but didn't make his debut until 25 March 2017 against Bosnia. He would go on to play 4 more games in Gibraltar's maiden World Cup qualification campaign.

Honours
Lincoln Red Imps
 Pepe Reyes Cup: 2017

References

1989 births
Living people
Gibraltar Phoenix F.C. players
Gibraltar United F.C. players
Glacis United F.C. players
Lincoln Red Imps F.C. players
Lions Gibraltar F.C. players
Manchester 62 F.C. players
Gibraltarian footballers
Gibraltar international footballers
Association football defenders
Gibraltar Premier Division players